Ananyevskaya is a rural locality (a village) in Spasskoye Rural Settlement, Tarnogsky District, Vologda Oblast, Russia. The population was 3 as of 2002.

Geography 
Naumovskaya is the nearest rural locality.

References 

Rural localities in Tarnogsky District